The Westchester Academy for International Studies (WAIS) is a public charter school in the Spring Branch Independent School District in Houston, Texas.  It serves grades 6–12 and is an International Baccalaureate continuum school, authorized for Middle Years, Career-related, and Diploma Programmes.  Dr. Valerie Hernandez is the director.

History

Westchester High School (1967–1985)
Due to the expanding enrollment of Memorial High School the school district built Westchester High School in 1967.  The school opened with an enrollment of one thousand eight hundred students.  After seven years the school had increased to nearly four thousand students. The campus could not support the numbers, and as such Stratford High School was built in close proximity to Westchester, opening in 1974.

Due to the oil bust in the early 1980s, the destruction of nearby apartment complexes, and many original home owners keeping their homes after their children had grown, enrollment in all SBISD high schools dropped dramatically.  By 1985, the resulting decreases in enrollment forced the school board to close Westchester and relocate its former students to Memorial, Spring Woods and Stratford High Schools.  Most Westchester students ended up attending Stratford High School, which for many years kept a permanent display case dedicated to Westchester memorabilia.

Westchester Campus of Houston Community College (1987–1999)
During a thirteen-year period the campus was leased to Houston Community College.

In 1987 about 30 students from SBISD and the Houston Independent School District gathered at Westchester High to study Japanese on every Saturday.

Westchester Academy for International Studies (1999–Present)
After this duration Spring Branch ISD made plans for the campus that resulted in a massive amount of construction and improvement on the pre-existing campus. In 1999 it reopened its doors as "Westchester Academy for International Studies". The school would eventually cap at one thousand students spanning across grades 6–12th. During the 2004–05 school year, the campus was shared with Stratford, due to renovations occurring on Stratford's campus. It is notable for being the only high school in Spring Branch ISD to offer the International Baccalaureate Diploma program at grades 11 and 12, an authorized Middle Years IB Program for grades 6–10, and has been recently authorized for the IB Career-related Programme. In 2014, Westchester was ranked in the top twenty-five high schools in Houston.

In Summer 2016, Jennifer Collier stepped down as Director to take the vacant Spring Woods principal position. Kathy Menotti was named Interim Director, with Kristin Nash accepting the position as assistant director of the middle school. On October 3, 2016, Kathy Menotti stepped down as interim director, and was replaced by Dr. Pamela Butler, who was the school's first director.Dr. Valerie Muniz (Now Hernandez) was chosen as the new permanent director of WAIS in May 2017. Kathy Menotti retired from her original position of assistant director of the Middle School in early 2017. Her replacement was chosen as Pamela Redd from Meadow Wood Elementary. Currently, the middle school director is Jesse Tachiquin, while the high school director is Alexia Greiner, while the IB Career Related Programme Coordinator is Sara Sebesta Camano and the IB Diploma Programme Coordinator is to be chosen by August 2022.

Campus
The campus of WAIS is divided into several wings (A–E).  The A Wing houses the middle school, foreign language department, and technology classes.  The B Wing houses the auditorium, theatre department, cafeteria, choir department, main office, and the Director's Office.  The C Wing house the wood gym and the dance room. The D Wing houses the rubber gym and storage areas.  Lastly, the E Wing houses the upper school and the Upper School Administration office.

The WAIS campus is also home to the Southwest Transition Campus for elementary schools that are being rebuilt.  The classes are housed in temporary buildings on the north side of the campus.

Altharetta Yeargin Art Museum

The Altharetta Yeargin Art Museum (AYAM) is an art museum funded by the Spring Branch Independent School District. It is one of the only school districts in the nation that has an art museum. The museum is housed on the north side of the campus.

National Blue Ribbon School
WAIS was named a 2011 National Blue Ribbon School.  It is one of only 304 schools nationwide to be honored for overall "academic excellence" and for success in closing student achievement gaps. Only 10 schools in Texas were named Blue Ribbon Schools in 2011.

Weekend uses
The Japanese Language Supplementary School of Houston, a supplementary Japanese school operated by the Japanese Educational Institute (JEI), holds its classes at WAIS on Saturdays. It is for children between ages 5 and 18 who are Japanese speakers.  the program is headed by Yoshihiko Saito (斎藤 義彦 Saitō Yoshihiko).

Notable alumni
Berkeley Breathed, Cartoonist
David Clyde, Baseball
Barbara Comstock, former Congresswoman for Virginia's 10th congressional district
Robert Draper, Author, journalist, The New York Times, Rolling Stone
Tilman Fertitta, Entrepreneur, Landry's, etc.
Diane Pamela Wood, U.S. Court of Appeals judge
Wes Anderson, movie director, (attended, graduated St. Johns)
Scott Donie, Olympic diver, (attended, graduated in Miami, FL)

Popular culture
In Reba, Reba's daughter attends Westchester High School. The school mascot is the Wildcats, and was filmed in the Wilchester subdivision.

References

https://cms.springbranchisd.com/Portals/29/campusdocs/WAIS-Profile-Sheet-2018.pdf?ver=2017-11-06-142101-703

External links

Spring Branch Independent School District schools
Spring Branch Independent School District high schools
Charter high schools in Houston
Public middle schools in Houston
Charter schools in Houston